Um Himmels Willen (English: For Heaven's Sake) is a German television sitcom created by Jana Brandt and Sven Döbler, which originally aired on Das Erste since 8 January 2002. The 13th season was aired from 4 March 2014 to 3 June 2014 and is syndicated in many European countries.

The series follows the daily life of a group of nuns in a small monastery in the fictional town of Kaltenthal in lower Bavaria, and the careers of the town's troubled citizens, mostly the mayor and police officers. The sitcom was produced by ARD. It originally starred Jutta Speidel as the main character of the head nun, however she was replaced by Janina Hartwig in 2007. Fritz Wepper appears as her antagonist, the cunning and jovial town mayor.

The show aired at 20:15 on Tuesday nights on ARD in Germany. By June 2013, 156 episodes had been broadcast over eleven seasons. Besides being immensely popular in Germany (with some 7.2 million views per episode), the show is also broadcast daily in Austria, Switzerland, Italy, Hungary, and Denmark.

Plot 
Wolfgang Wöller (Fritz Wepper), the popular politician and mayor of the fictitious Lower Bavarian town of Kaltenthal, is afraid of losing support and possible elections due an increase in unemployment. Along with the city council, he falls in love with the idea of bioenergy; determined to put his face and name upon a new, large bioenergy facility that will, hopefully, create economic growth for the town, he needs the support of opposition, who refuse to support the idea as there is no immediate place to put such a facility.

Eventually, his eyes fall upon the local cloisters, a large, old castle which houses only six nuns, but swallows up a huge areal portion of the city. As the nuns, especially Sister Hanna (Janina Hartwig), refuse to even discuss the idea of selling the property, Mr. Wöller takes his ideas to the order's Mother Superior. The Mother Superior is equally opposed to the idea, but agrees that six nuns are not enough for such a huge property. She ultimately  reluctantly agrees to sell. Sister Hanna does everything in her power to prevent this, not only going against the mayor, but also the Mother Superior.

Cast

Current main cast 

 Janina Hartwig as Sister Hanna Jacobi. Nun and leader of cloister Kaltenthal.
 Fritz Wepper as Wolfgang Wöller. Mayor of the fictitious town of Kaltentahl and car dealer. Chairman of the Kaltenthal Football Club.
 Karin Gregorek as Sister Felicitas Meier. Nun, one of sister Hanna's predecessors. Until her retirement nurse at Kaltenthal hospital, then leader of a medical consulting center for socially weak people. Preference for alcohol, tobacco, computer games and chocolate.
 Emmanuela von Frankenberg as Sister Agnes Schwandt. Nun and cook of the cloister. Herb woman.
 Denise M'Baye as Sister Lela. Novation at cloister Kaltenthal. Sent by sister Lotte from Nigeria.
 Andrea Sihler as Sister Hildegard Hähnlein. Nun at the mother house in Munich  and secretary  of the mother superior. Secondarily novelist.
 Horst Sachtleben as Bishop Gottlieb Rossbauer. Friend and confessor of the mother superior. Likes cookies. Renounces creation as cardinal.
 Andrea Wildner as Marianne Laban. Secretary of mayor Wöller. In season 12 temporary opposition leader at local council
 Lars Weström as Anton Meier. Indulgent Polizeihauptmeister (policeman) of Kaltenthal. 
 Wolfgang Müller as Hermann Huber. Master builder and best friend of Wolfgang Wöller.

Former main cast 

 Rosel Zech as Dr. Dr. Elisabeth Reuter. Ex mother superior.
 Gaby Dohm as Baroness Louise von Beilheim. Mother superior and successor of mother superior Elisabeth Reuter.
 Jutta Speidel as Sister Lotte Albers. Nun and direct predecessor of sister Hanna. Now leader of a mission station in Nigeria.
 Michael Wenninger as Doctor Martin Richter. Physician and fiancé of Barbara Silenius. Died after a car crash.
 Anna Luise Kiss as Barbara Silenius. Former novation at cloister Kaltenthal. Leaves the cloister and become engaged with Doctor Martin Richter, who dies after a car crash. Barbara later marries an architect but the marriage fails. Barbara Silenius dies after a car accident.
 Hellen Zellweger as Julia Seewald. Former novation at cloister Kaltenthal. Leaves the cloister.
 Anne Weinknecht as Sister Sophe Tiezte. Former novation at cloister Kaltenthal, later nun. Now missionary in South America.
 Donia Ben-Jemia as Sister Gina Gallo. Former novation at cloister Kaltenthal, later nun. Goes to Naples to nurse her ill father.
 Nathalie Schott as Sister Ingrid Knoop. Former novation at cloister Kaltenthal, now nun at a cloister in Cologne.
 Antje Mönning as Sister Jenny Marquard. Former novation at cloister Kaltenthal, now nun and nurse of the ill Cardinal.
 Julia Heinze as Maria Gasser.  Former undercover journalist, later novation at cloister Kaltenthal. Leaves the cloister and marries.
 Bruni Löbel as Grandma Meier. Grandmother of police man Anton Meier.

Seasons

Series overview

Christmas-Specials 

Until 2014 four feature-length Christmas specials of Um Himmels Willen were produced.

Um Himmels Willen — Weihnachten in Kaltenthal 
(English: Christmas at Kaltenthal, first aired: 23 December 2008) Just before Christmas mayor Wöller receives an invitation from the Vatican, he asks sister Hanna to accompany him. In Rome it turns out that the invitation was not for a private audience with the pope, but for an event at St. Peter's Basilica. Wöller and Hanna are disappointed and want to travel back to Germany straightaway, but a general strike bars them from this. Meanwhile, the other nuns of Kaltenthal are preparing the yearly children's Christmas party, and mother superior Elisabeth Reuter gets a surprising visit from her predecessor.

Um Himmels Willen — Weihnachten unter Palmen 
(English: Christmas under palms, first aired: 25 December 2010) Mayor Wöller wants to escape from the Christmas confusion by booking a
Mediterranean cruise. Hardly on board he gets shocked, because  sisters Hanna, Agnes and Felicitas from cloister Kaltenthal are on the same ship. They received the crusade as a gift, and have in mind to collect donations for a Kaltenthal family in need underway. The nuns meet Felix, son of the ship's owner Max Brockmann. The boy lost his mother by an auto accident and become friends with the crew member Ursula Henning. This not sits well with the boy's father, and he fires Ursula. When Ursula gets of board at Teneriffa, Felix tries to run after her, but Hanna keeps him off and tries to find a solution for this trying situation. Meanwhile, Wöller got to know Isabella Kegel, who is born in Kaltenthal and he wants to marry her on board promptly, but Isabella ditches him right before the wedding altar. Wöller has dumped on Isabella years before when he was looking for a wife, because of her overweight. In fact that she reduced nearly 30 kilograms Wöller don't recognize her on board of the cruise ship.

Um Himmels Willen — Mission unmöglich 
(English: Mission impossible, first aired: 20 December 2012) Mayor of Kaltenthal and car seller Wolfgang Wöller, sold the majority of his second-hand cars to Nigeria and did advance payment thatfore. It transpired fastly that he was fooled by a fraud. Cause of the fact, that he took money out of the public purse of Kaltenthal a political scandal is threaten. To avoid this, he travels to Nigeria, accompanied by sister Hanna from cloister Kaltenthal. Hanna would like to find there Doctor Mabenga, fired physician of Kaltenthal hospital, who traveled to Nigeria with his daughter after an argument with his wife. Wöller and Hanna are visiting sister Lotte, Hannas predecessor, who now leads a mission station in Nigeria.

Um Himmels Willen – Das Wunder von Fatima 
(English: The Wonder of Fátima, first aired: 25 December 2014) Sister Hanna, Mayor Wöller an the wealthy widow Sonja Berger together travel to Fátima in Portugal to find the missing early love of Mrs. Berger, Thomas Breitner. Mayor Wöller, who seems uncommonly helpful and generous, again has a selfish hidden agenda: he considers the wealthy Mrs. Berger as the legendary "Angel of Kaltenthal", who favors homeless persons with anonymous donations. For reasons of re-election he has repurposed donations of 50.000 Euros, which are originally dedicated for war orphans, to the gun club of Kaltenthal, and has to fill this gap of money urgently. Therefore he hopes for the goodwill of the rich widow.

Awards
 2002: Goldene Europa for Jutta Speidel and Fritz Wepper
 2003: Deutscher Fernsehpreis in the category „Best Actor of a Series“ for Fritz Wepper
 2006: Bayerischer Fernsehpreis in the category „Best Actress of a Series“ for Jutta Speidel
 2006: Bayerischer Fernsehpreis in the category „Best Actor of a Series“ for Fritz Wepper
 2010: Goldene Henne in the category „Acting“ for Janina Hartwig and Fritz Wepper
 2010: Bambi, audience choice as the most popular television series

See also
 Wilsberg
 Das Traumschiff
 Stolberg

References

External links
 

German comedy television series
2002 German television series debuts
2000s German television series
2010s German television series
2020s German television series
German-language television shows
Das Erste original programming
Religious comedy television series
Television series about nuns
Television shows set in Bavaria